Anderson High School Wigwam is an indoor arena in Anderson, Indiana. The current version hosted home games for the Anderson High School Indians and was home to the Indiana Alley Cats of the Continental Basketball Association and the Anderson Champions of the American Basketball Association. The previous arena hosted Anderson Packers, a founding member of the National Basketball Association.

The complex is being redeveloped into while preserving the gymnasium, which was listed on the National Register of Historic Places in 2018. It is currently under renovation and preparing for reopening in the near future.

History
The original arena hosted the NBA's Anderson Packers from 1946 to 1950. It burned down in 1958. The replacement arena opened up in November 1961 and has a capacity of 8,996. It was the second largest high school basketball arena, after New Castle Fieldhouse in New Castle, Indiana. Before the construction of Market Square Arena, the Indiana Pacers played several games at the Wigwam.

On March 18, 2008, U.S. Secret Service agents met with members of Anderson Police Department for a tour at the Wigwam, where Hillary Clinton was due to speak. Her speech at The Wigwam occurred on March 20, 2008, and lasted about an hour. The school district netted $335 from the rental for this event.

Facing a budget crisis, on March 8, 2011, the Anderson School Board voted six to one to close the Wigwam to save an estimated $700,000 annually. In August 2014, the school board accepted a plan that would allow for redevelopment of the site while maintaining the gymnasium through at least 2030. One section of The Wigwam is currently home to the Jane Pauley Community Health Center–Wigwam, a non-profit clinic that offers primary and behavioral health care. There are plans to add more businesses in the future. When renovations are complete, the school district will have rent-free access to the arena for at least 12 event days per year, plus practices.

See also
 Largest high school gyms in the United States

References

External links
Anderson Wigwam Fan Site

Historic photographs of Wigwam Gymnasium from the Arthur B. Henning Architectural Records Collection

American Basketball Association (2000–present) venues
Buildings and structures in Anderson, Indiana
Basketball venues in Indiana
Gyms in the United States
Indoor arenas in Indiana
National Basketball League (United States) venues
Anderson Packers
Sports venues completed in 1961
National Register of Historic Places in Madison County, Indiana